Achim Schwarze (born 1958) is a German author. His works include self-help books and are influenced by black comedy and anarchism.

External links
Official homepage of Achim Schwarze 

1958 births
Living people
German self-help writers
German male non-fiction writers
Place of birth missing (living people)
Date of birth missing (living people)
20th-century German male writers